The 1985 Ice Hockey World Championships took place in Prague, Czechoslovakia from 17 April to 3 May. Eight teams took part, with each team playing each other once. The four best teams then played each other once more with no results carrying over, and the other four teams played each other again to determine ranking and relegation. This was the 50th World Championships, and also the 61st European Championships of ice hockey. The home side, Czechoslovakia, became world champions for the 6th time, and the Soviet Union won their 23rd European title. For the European Championship, only games between European sides in the first round are included.

This was a historic tournament in a few respects.  The Soviets were playing without goaltender Tretiak for the first time since 1969.  This was Canada's best finish since returning to the Championships in 1977, and after defeating the Soviet Union for the first time in the World Championships since 1961, they played for gold on the last day.  Despite Canada's silver medal, the first round saw a professionally stocked Canada lose to the Americans for the first time.  Perhaps the most surprising aspect of the tournament was Sweden's poor play.  After finishing second in the 1984 Canada Cup expectations were high, but they had their worst finish since 1937, playing in the relegation pool for the first time. It would also be East Germany's final appearance at the top level.

The tournament finished on a sour note when the US and Soviet Union faced off against each other for the bronze medal.  Several fights broke out, resulting in suspensions of coaches Viktor Tikhonov and Dave Peterson, as well as players Irek Gimayev, Vyacheslav Fetisov and Tim Thomas. Additionally referee Kjell Lind was disciplined for failing to keep control of the game.

World Championship Group A (Czechoslovakia)

First round

Final Round

Consolation round

East Germany were relegated to Group B.

World Championship Group B (Switzerland)
Played in Fribourg 21–31 March.  In the final game, the Swiss had to win by more than four to win the tournament.  While the margin was attainable, the unpredictable Dutch side shocked the home crowd beating them six to two.

Poland was promoted to Group A, and both Norway and Hungary were relegated to Group C.

World Championship Group C (France)
Played in Megève, Chamonix and Saint-Gervais 14–23 March.

France and Yugoslavia were both promoted to Group B.  For France this was their first return to this level since they boycotted in protest in 1972

Ranking and statistics

Tournament Awards
Best players selected by the directorate:
Best Goaltender:       Jiří Králík
Best Defenceman:       Viacheslav Fetisov
Best Forward:          Sergei Makarov
Media All-Star Team:
Goaltender:  Jiří Králík
Defence:  Viacheslav Fetisov,  Alexei Kasatonov
Forwards:  Vladimir Krutov,  Sergei Makarov,  Vladimír Růžička

Final standings
The final standings of the tournament according to IIHF:

European championships final standings
The final standings of the European championships according to IIHF:

Scoring leaders
List shows the top skaters sorted by points, then goals.
Source:

Leading goaltenders
Only the top five goaltenders, based on save percentage, who have played 50% of their team's minutes are included in this list.
Source:

Citations

References

Complete results

IIHF Men's World Ice Hockey Championships
World Championships
World
1985
Sports competitions in Prague
1980s in Prague
March 1985 sports events in Europe
April 1985 sports events in Europe
May 1985 sports events in Europe
International ice hockey competitions hosted by Switzerland
International ice hockey competitions hosted by France
1984–85 in Swiss ice hockey
1984–85 in French ice hockey
Fribourg